Levally Lower is a townland approximately  from Enniskillen, County Fermanagh, along the main Enniskillen to Belleek road. It is primarily located between the Levally Road and the Drumcose Road.

See also 
 List of townlands in County Fermanagh

Townlands of County Fermanagh